Heidi Pillwein is an Austrian retired slalom canoeist who competed in the 1940s and the 1950s. She won three gold medals at the ICF Canoe Slalom World Championships, earning them in 1949 (Folding K-1, Folding K-1 team) and 1951 (Folding K-1 team).

References

Austrian female canoeists
Possibly living people
Year of birth missing (living people)
Medalists at the ICF Canoe Slalom World Championships